Nitrincola alkalisediminis is a Gram-negative, aerobic and alkaliphilic bacterium from the genus of Nitrincola which has been isolated from the Lonar Lake in India.

References

External links
Type strain of Nitrincola alkalisediminis at BacDive -  the Bacterial Diversity Metadatabase

Oceanospirillales
Bacteria described in 2016